Patriot is the name of four superheroes appearing in American comic books published by Marvel Comics. These include the Golden Age hero Jeffrey Mace and the modern-day characters Eli Bradley and Rayshaun Lucas.

All three incarnations have made appearances in Marvel-related media, with Jeffrey Mace and Eli Bradley appearing in live-action television series set in the Marvel Cinematic Universe: Mace portrayed by Jason O'Mara in the fourth season of Agents of S.H.I.E.L.D. and Slingshot (both 2017), and Bradley portrayed by Elijah Richardson in The Falcon and the Winter Soldier (2021) respectively, with an uncredited actor also filming scenes as Bradley in scenes cut from Black Panther (2018).

Fictional character biography

Patriot (Jeffrey Mace)

The first Patriot, Jeffrey Mace, created by writer Ray Gill and artist Bill Everett, debuted in The Human Torch # 4 (Spring 1941; numbered #3 on cover). He was a reporter who became a costumed adventurer after seeing Captain America in action, and was later a member of the World War II superhero team the Liberty Legion. The Patriot himself became the third Captain America.

Patriot (Eli Bradley)
The second Marvel Universe character to use the name Patriot debuted in Young Avengers #1 (April 2005): Eli Bradley, grandson of Isaiah Bradley, who took up the mantle of Captain America following the disappearance of Steve Rogers in World War II. Isaiah had received his powers in the limited series Truth: Red, White & Black as part of an early Super-Soldier Serum experiment tested on African American men in an attempt to reproduce the formula lost after being used to turn Steve Rogers into Captain America. Eli's mother was conceived before Isaiah's involvement with the experiment, however, so Eli could not have inherited his grandfather's powers genetically.

When Iron Lad began his search for the next generation of Avengers, he came to the Bradley household in search of Isaiah's son, Josiah. However, Josiah had been missing for several months, and Iron Lad met Eli instead. Eli claimed to have gained superpowers through an emergency blood transfusion from his grandfather, but this was untrue. He later gained his powers artificially with Mutant Growth Hormone (MGH), an illegal street drug that causes brief periods of superhuman abilities. MGH has been demonstrated to promote irritability in individuals. Writer Allan Heinberg has stated that Bradley's drug usage is based on his own history, stating

Patriot became a founding member of the Young Avengers. The public believed his costume resembled that of Captain America's 1940s sidekick, Bucky, but he revealed that his costume is a redesign of his grandfather's. He has an adversarial relationship with teammate Hawkeye, who nonetheless gave him Captain America's original star-spangled triangular shield.

When the truth about Eli's lack of superpowers was revealed, Eli quit the team. He returned after the Hulkling was kidnapped by the Super-Skrull, and the other Young Avengers convinced him that he was the only one of them capable of leading the team, even without his powers. Patriot was later gravely wounded by a Kree warrior when he jumped in front of a blast meant for Captain America, and received a blood transfusion from his grandfather, Isaiah, which granted him the abilities afforded by the Super-Soldier Serum.

Eli joins Captain America's Secret Avengers during the 2006 - 2007 "Civil War" storyline. Patriot leads his team to assist the Runaways after they were attacked by the government. The Young Avengers and the Runaways worked together when two of their members were captured, and the Runaways decided to stay out of the mix in the war. Patriot managed to keep most of his team together, but Stature decided to join Iron Man's side.

Eli later seeks out the Winter Soldier, whom he had earlier met during the "Civil War" storyline, to discuss the nature of patriotism at a time when he disagrees with the Superhero Registration Act, and much of the way America is being governed. The two have a heartfelt chat about America as an idea and about the original Patriot, Jeffrey Mace.

During the 2008 "Secret Invasion" storyline, Eli and the other Young Avengers are the first team to respond to the Skrull invasion of Manhattan. Despite their valiant efforts, and the aid of the Initiative cadets, they are all defeated. However, they are saved by the timely arrival of Nick Fury and the Secret Warriors, and help Earth's heroes defeat the Skrull invaders.

During the 2008 - 2009 "Dark Reign" storyline, Eli is outraged when Norman Osborn formed his "official" team of Avengers and even more so when he announces a new team of Young Avengers. Eli's Young Avengers confront the latter and demand that they either join the first team of Young Avengers, or find another name for themselves. Near the end of the issue, Hawkeye (Kate Bishop) admits her love for Eli after he breaks his hand, to which he responds 'I may break my hand everyday', making their relationship clear after a few months of dating.

Eli appears alongside the other Young Avengers in Avengers: Children's Crusade. He ultimately leaves the group at the end of the story, feeling guilty for preventing the Scarlet Witch from undoing the near-extinction of mutantkind that she had previously caused in the 2005 "Decimation" storyline.

Eli is later mentioned in Gillen's volume 2 of Young Avengers when Tommy Shepherd confirms the Not-Patriot is an impostor.

During the 2020 "Empyre" storyline, Eli makes a cameo at the wedding of his former teammates Wiccan and Hulkling following the defeat of the Cotati.

Patriot (Young Avengers)

Throughout Young Avengers Vol. 2, written by Kieron Gillen, and launched in January 2013 as part of the Marvel NOW! rebranding campaign, the titular team is haunted by a new multiversal Patriot, who captures Speed. At the story's conclusion, Prodigy correctly surmises that this Patriot is a member of the team who has been transformed into a non-human entity in some future magical event, and is now echoing backward along the timeline in order to ensure this future comes to pass. Guessing that this person may well be himself, he kisses the Patriot, causing the Patriot to vanish and Speed to reappear in his place.

Patriot (Rayshaun Lucas)
In March 2017, Marvel announced that it would be introducing a new Patriot during the 2017 "Secret Empire" storyline. The new Patriot is Rayshaun Lucas, a teen activist who idolizes Sam Wilson. Lucas is living in Brooklyn with his mother when Sam Wilson releases footage showing that Rage has been wrongfully accused of burglary, and savagely beaten by Keane Industries' private security personnel, the Americops. Following Rage unjust conviction, Shaun painted his face to resemble Rage's mask and then slipped out to firebomb a local bank, before participating in the subsequent riots in New York City.

After Sam Wilson resigns as Captain America, Shaun washes the Rage mask from his face and began to draw designs for a costume that he calls the Patriot.

After the Black Widow finds a notebook with a Patriot suit drawn on it in the backpack of Rayshaun Lucas when he arrives at the secret Hydra resistance base known as "the Mount," she gives the notebook to the Tony Stark A.I. associated with Riri Williams, who in turn builds the suit. After trying to stop a group of bullies from taking an iPad from a little girl, Rayshaun gets beaten. Afterwards, the Tony Stark A.I. calls Rayshaun and gives him the suit that he made for him, explaining that Rayshaun gave him hope again and that the suit is a way to thank him for that. Rayshaun trains with an A.I. version of the Black Widow that the Tony Stark A.I. made and eventually confronts the bullies while he wears the suit and defeats them, giving the little girl her iPad back. Miles Morales and Joaquin Torres tell Rayshaun that they heard about him and that they are looking forward to having him on their team.

Patriot later appears in the desert, where he overhears a discussion between Sam Wilson and Misty Knight. He then tells Sam about the people who need his help and support him, despite what the HYDRA government says. This conversation inspires Sam to reassume his mantle of Captain America.

After HYDRA's attack on Las Vegas, Nevada, the Patriot helps the Champions in their search for survivors. When the Champions are expressing frustration over their failure, the Patriot arrives with a baby, the sole survivor of the attack, which inspires the team to continue fighting HYDRA.

The Patriot later becomes the Falcon's sidekick, and together, they deal with the gang violence in Chicago, unaware that Blackheart is posing as the Mayor of that city.

Powers, abilities, and equipment
While secretly using his specially concocted MGH formula, Eli Bradley possesses agility, strength, speed, endurance, and reaction-time superior to that of normal Super-Soldiers like his grandfather and Captain America, but at a heavy physical and mental cost. After receiving a blood transfusion from his grandfather, Eli develops genuine Super-Soldier abilities, which include superhuman strength, stamina, speed, reflexes, agility, and senses. He also possesses a degree of resistance to injury that makes his skin bulletproof, as well as a healing factor. In Civil War #2, Eli appears to possess the full physical abilities of a Super-Soldier. He is able to outrun a helicopter, shrug off a hail of tranquilizer darts, jump 100 feet through the air, and survive a massive explosion. The Patriot carries a replica of Captain America's original, star-spangled, heater shield, similar to the unpainted one originally carried into battle by his grandfather Isaiah. He also carries white metallic throwing stars patterned after those on the American flag.

Rayshaun Lucas is an expert at hand-to-hand combat ever since he trained with an A.I. version of Black Widow. He also wields a shield created by the Tony Stark A.I. that triples as a glider and a drone.

Other versions
In Exiles: Days of Then and Now, the Patriot was seen as a member of Quentin Quire's surviving team of heroes fighting against the Annihilation Wave.

In Avengers: The Children's Crusade, Eli Bradley briefly appears in a possible future timeline as part of a new group of Avengers seen in the Children's Crusade event. By this time, he has succeeded Steve Rogers to become the new Captain America and fights crime alongside his wife Samantha, the new Falcon. Their son Steve is also a member of the Avengers as the new Bucky.

In other media

Marvel Cinematic Universe
Different adaptations of Patriot appear in media set in the Marvel Cinematic Universe.
 Jason O'Mara portrays Jeffrey Mace in the fourth season of the television series Agents of S.H.I.E.L.D. This version is an ex-journalist who received a serum that enhances his strength and durability and is appointed the public face and new director of S.H.I.E.L.D. following the events of season three, the Sokovia Accords, and the public outlawing of Steve Rogers in the film Captain America: Civil War. 
 Mace also appears in the companion web series Agents of S.H.I.E.L.D.: Slingshot, credited as a main cast member.
 The Eli Bradley incarnation of the Patriot was going to appear in the film Black Panther, portrayed by an uncredited actor, but the actor's scenes were removed during production.
Elijah Richardson portrays Eli Bradley in the Disney+ miniseries The Falcon and the Winter Soldier. This version is a teenager who lives with his grandfather, Isaiah Bradley.

Film
The Rayshaun Lucas incarnation of the Patriot appears in Marvel Rising: Secret Warriors, voiced by Kamil McFadden. This version is a S.H.I.E.L.D. agent partnered with Daisy Johnson.

Video games
The Eli Bradley incarnation of the Patriot appears in Marvel Ultimate Alliance 2, voiced by Ogie Banks. This version is a supporter of the Anti-Registration campaign and appears as a boss for the Pro-Registration campaign.

References

External links
 World of Black Heroes: Patriot-Eli Bradley Biography
 Patriot (Elijah Bradley) at Marvel.com
 Independent Heroes from the U.S.A.: Patriot
 Grand Comics Database: The Human Torch #4
 The Unofficial Handbook of Marvel Comics Creators

Articles about multiple fictional characters
Avengers (comics) characters
Comics characters introduced in 1941
Comics characters introduced in 2005
Fictional African-American people
Fictional blade and dart throwers
Fictional characters with superhuman senses
Fictional shield fighters
Marvel Comics child superheroes
Marvel Comics male superheroes
Marvel Comics mutates
United States-themed superheroes
Marvel Comics characters who can move at superhuman speeds
Marvel Comics characters with accelerated healing
Marvel Comics characters with superhuman strength
Fictional reporters
Characters created by Allan Heinberg